"Mess Is Mine" is a song by Australian singer-songwriter Vance Joy, released on 9 July 2014 as the lead single from his debut studio album Dream Your Life Away (2014). The song peaked at number 37 on the Australian national singles chart,

Music video
A music video to accompany the release of "Mess Is Mine" was first released onto YouTube on 9 July 2014 at a total length of three minutes and fifty-four seconds and was directed by Luci Schroder.

Popular culture
"Mess is Mine" features in the soundtrack of the popular video game by EA Sports, FIFA 15 as final track in game soundtrack's album. It was also featured in fourth season of the American television show Hart of Dixie, the first episode of the Netflix original series 13 Reasons Why, and in the trailer for the 2017 film The Big Sick and 2018 Netflix original film Sierra Burgess is a Loser. Vance has also publicly said the song and many others on this album were written about Amber Morris, a girl he met while touring in Texas.

The song was also used on a Delta TV ad in 2015.

Track listing

Charts

Weekly charts

Year-end charts

Certifications

Release history

References

2014 singles
2014 songs
Vance Joy songs
Songs written by Vance Joy